Pearl Theatre may refer to:

Pearl Concert Theatre of Palms Casino Resort, Las Vegas
Pearl Theatre (Philadelphia)
Pearl Theatre (New York City)